Mandala is a 1981 South Korean film about Buddhist monks in Korea. This is considered by many critics to be director Im Kwon-taek's breakthrough film as a cinematic artist.

Plot 
The film follows the differing lives of two Buddhist monks in Korea. By following their lives and their interaction throughout the film, Im creates a contemplation of the nature of individualism, religious belief and enlightenment.

Awards
Best Director, 20th Grand Bell Awards (South Korea) 
Grand Prix Hawaii Film Festival

Notes

Sources
 
 
 
 

1981 films
Films about Buddhism
Films directed by Im Kwon-taek
1980s Korean-language films
South Korean drama films